Tugali suteri is a species of small sea snail or limpet, a marine gastropod mollusc in the Family Fissurellidae, the keyhole limpets and slit limpets.

A subspecies of this limpet is Tugali suteri sutherlandi.

References

 Maxwell, P.A. (2009). Cenozoic Mollusca. Pp 232-254 in Gordon, D.P. (ed.) New Zealand inventory of biodiversity. Volume one. Kingdom Animalia: Radiata, Lophotrochozoa, Deuterostomia. Canterbury University Press, Christchurch

External links
 

Fissurellidae
Gastropods of New Zealand
Gastropods described in 1916